Hardiantono (born 26 June 1989) is an Indonesian professional footballer who currently plays for PSMS Medan in Liga 2 as a defender.

Career
He made his professional debut against Madura United F.C. in first week 2016 Indonesia Soccer Championship A.

References

External links
 

1989 births
Living people
Sportspeople from Medan
Indonesian footballers
Association football defenders
Persikabo 1973 players